Frederick William Dale (26 October 1925 – 26 November 2011) was an English professional footballer who played as a  winger in the Football League.

References

1925 births
2011 deaths
English footballers
Scunthorpe United F.C. players
Accrington Stanley F.C. (1891) players
Crewe Alexandra F.C. players
Halifax Town A.F.C. players
Cheltenham Town F.C. players
Retford United F.C. players
Southport F.C. players
English Football League players
Association football wingers